James Francis Lind (October 17, 1900 – April 11, 1975) was a Democratic member of the U.S. House of Representatives from Pennsylvania.

Early life and career
James F. Lind was born in York, Pennsylvania, the son of William E. and Alice E. (née Shanabrough) Lind. He graduated from a Penn State branch campus as an accountant.  He served in the United States Army from 1917 to 1920, 1941 to 1946, and in 1953.  He also served in the United States Army Reserve from 1934 to 1941, and the Pennsylvania National Guard from 1934 to 1941.  He served on the Veterans’ Administration of York County, Pennsylvania, from 1946 to 1947, and as chief clerk to the York County Board of Commissioners in 1948.

He married Grace Elizabeth Stahl in 1922, and they had one son, R. James Lind.

Tenure
Lind was elected as a Democrat to the 81st Congress in 1948, defeating incumbent Republican Congressman Chester H. Gross, and was re-elected to the 82nd Congress in 1950.  He was an unsuccessful candidate for reelection in 1952, defeated by Republican S. Walter Stauffer.

Retirement and death
After his time in Congress, he served as controller of York County.  He died on April 11, 1975, in York and is interred in Arlington National Cemetery.

References

The Political Graveyard

1900 births
1975 deaths
Burials at Arlington National Cemetery
United States Army reservists
United States Army soldiers
United States Army personnel of World War I
Military personnel from Pennsylvania
Politicians from York, Pennsylvania
American accountants
Democratic Party members of the United States House of Representatives from Pennsylvania
20th-century American politicians